Tir Kola or Tir Kala may refer to:
 Tir Kola, Amol
 Tir Kola, Babol
 Tir Kola, Sari